{{DISPLAYTITLE:C22H38O5}}
The molecular formula C22H38O5 (molar mass: 382.53 g/mol, exact mass: 382.2719 u) may refer to:

 Misoprostol
 Unoprostone

Molecular formulas